Sulu's 1st congressional district is a congressional district in the province of Sulu. It has been represented in the House of Representatives of the Philippines since 1987. The district encompasses the western half of Jolo island composed of six municipalities that include its namesake town, the capital of Sulu, as well as the northern outlying islands of the Marungas (Hadji Panglima Tahil) and Pangutaran. It is currently represented in the 18th Congress by Samier A. Tan of the PDP–Laban.

Representation history

Election results

2019

2016

2013

2010

See also
Legislative districts of Sulu

References

Congressional districts of the Philippines
Politics of Sulu
1987 establishments in the Philippines
Congressional districts of Bangsamoro
Constituencies established in 1987